Her Reputation is a 1923 silent film drama directed by John Griffith Wray and starring May McAvoy. It was produced by Thomas H. Ince and released through Associated First National.

Cast
May McAvoy as Jacqueline Lanier
Lloyd Hughes as Sherwood Mansfield
James Corrigan as 'Dad' Lawrence
Casson Ferguson as Jack Calhoun
Eric Mayne as Done Andres Miro
Winter Hall as John Mansfield
Louise Lester as Consuelo
Brinsley Shaw as Clinton Kent
George Larkin as Ramon Cervanez
Eugenie Besserer as Madame Cervanez
Jane Miller as Pepita
Gus Leonard as Rodriguez
Eugene Jackson as Boy pushed into pond
Jane Walsh as Little Girl

Preservation status
The film is now lost.

References

External links

Her Reputation at IMDb.com

1923 films
American silent feature films
Lost American films
First National Pictures films
Films directed by John Griffith Wray
American black-and-white films
Silent American drama films
1923 drama films
1923 lost films
Lost drama films
1920s American films